The 1971 NCAA College Division football rankings are from the United Press International poll of College Division head coaches and from the Associated Press poll of sportswriters and broadcasters. The 1971 NCAA College Division football season was the 14th year UPI published a Coaches Poll in what was termed the "Small College" division. It was the 12th year for the AP version of the Small College poll. The AP poll was a "Top 20" for the first week, but switched to a "Top 10" for the rest of the season.

Legend

The AP poll

The UPI Coaches poll

References

Rankings
NCAA College Division football rankings